Kona Coast may refer to:

Kona Coast, geographical feature of Big Island's Kona District in Hawaii, U.S.
Kona Coast (film), 1968 American film directed by Lamont Johnson
"Kona Coast", 1977 song written by members of The Beach Boys, Al Jardine, and Mike Love; appears on 1978's M.I.U. Album